Charles Marion Russell (1864–1926) was an American western painter.

Charlie Russell also may refer to:
 Charlie Taze Russell (1852–1916), American minister
 Charlie Russell (rugby) (1884–1957), Australian rugby player and coach
 Charlie L. Russell (1932–2013), American writer
 Charlie Russell (DJ) (1937–2011), Canadian country music DJ
 Charlie Russell (naturalist) (1941–2018), Canadian naturalist
 Charlie Russell (cricketer) (born 1988), English international cricketer
 Charlie Russell (producer) (fl. 2000s), British music producer
 Charlie Russell (actress) (fl. 2000s), English actress part of the Mischief Theatre ensemble

See also
 Charles Russell (disambiguation)
 Chuck Russell (born 1958), American film director
 Russell (surname)